Agoi, or Ibami, is an Upper Cross River language of Nigeria.

IPA Vowels:

Short Vowels: ten short oral vowels /i ɪ e ɛ ə a ɔ o ʊ u/

Long Vowels: seven long vowels /iː eː ɛː aː ɔː oː uː/

Reference: Yul-Ifode, Shirley. 2003. Vowel harmony and vowel merger in Agoi. Studies in African linguistics 32. 1-16.

References

Languages of Nigeria
Upper Cross River languages